Little Girl, Great Fortune is a 1933 German comedy film directed by E. W. Emo and starring Dolly Haas, Carl Esmond, and Adele Sandrock. It was shot at the Johannisthal Studios in Berlin. The film's sets were designed by the art director Fritz Maurischat.A separate Italian version One Night with You was also made.

Cast

References

Bibliography 
 
 Klaus, Ulrich J. Deutsche Tonfilme: Jahrgang 1933. Klaus-Archiv, 1988.

External links 
 

1933 films
1933 comedy films
German comedy films
1930s German-language films
Films directed by E. W. Emo
German multilingual films
German black-and-white films
1933 multilingual films
1930s German films
Films shot at Johannisthal Studios